Edward Wymarke (died 30 September 1634) was an English minor official and politician who sat in the House of Commons between 1597 and 1614.

Wymarke was the only son  of Edward Wymarke of Luffenham, Rutland and his wife Margaret Dudley, daughter of William Dudley of Clopton, Northamptonshire. He was known as "Ned Wymarke".

Wymarke was a fringe official who collected revenue for the crown from concealed lands and was reimbursed from the proceeds. In 1597, he was returned as Member of Parliament for Chippenham after the elected candidate Thomas Edmunds was sent abroad as an ambassador. He succeeded to the estates of his father in 1599. In 1601 he was re-elected MP  for Chippenham. He sold his revenue collection office and register of lands in 1602. In 1604 he was elected MP for Peterborough. He was re-elected MP for Peterborough in 1614. He was also elected MP for  Liverpool and Newcastle-under-Lyme in 1614 but it is not known which was his chosen seat. He lived comfortably in London, and is noted as bemusing his friends by going out by "owl light to the Star and to the Windmill".

Wymarke died probably unmarried  in 1634 and was buried in St. Botolph’s, Aldersgate. He left his estate to his sister Frances Green, wife of John Green of Market Overton, Rutland.

References

 

Year of birth missing
1634 deaths
Members of the Parliament of England for Newcastle-under-Lyme
English MPs 1597–1598
English MPs 1601
English MPs 1604–1611
English MPs 1614